Unrelated is a 2007 British drama film written and directed by Joanna Hogg, starring Kathryn Worth, Tom Hiddleston (in his feature film debut), Mary Roscoe, David Rintoul and Henry Lloyd-Hughes. It was released in the US on 20 February 2008.

Plot summary
Anna (Kathryn Worth) arrives in Tuscany to stay with her old school friend Verena (Mary Roscoe) and her family in their rented villa in San Fabiano. She was meant to be accompanied by her boyfriend, Alex, but tells Verena that he had to stay in London at the last minute to work. During the film it becomes apparent that Anna took the holiday to get some time away from him following a fight. The group is split effectively between the adults: Verena, her new husband Charlie (Michael Hadley), and Verena's cousin George (David Rintoul); and the teenagers: Verena's children, Jack (Henry Lloyd-Hughes) and Badge (Emma Hiddleston), Charlie's son, Archie (Harry Kershaw), and George's son, Oakley (Tom Hiddleston). Trying to escape her relationship worries, Anna spends increasingly more time with the teenagers, upsetting Verena. She joins in with their mild hedonism, even promising not to tell their parents about their marijuana smoking and a drug and drink-fuelled accident in a borrowed car.

Simmering sexual tension and flirtation between Anna and Oakley, the ringleader, comes to a head when she invites him to spend the night but he turns her down. Subsequently, Anna allows herself to grow apart from the teenagers and eventually tells Verena about the accident. The teenagers get into trouble and an argument between Oakley and his father turns physical. When Anna apologizes to Oakley for not telling him earlier, he tells her he has nothing to say to her: the teenagers also reject her. No longer fitting in with either age group, Anna leaves and checks into a hotel. Verena seeks her out and they reconcile after Anna reveals she cannot have children as she has reached menopause. She returns to the villa, is reconciled with the teenagers, and stays on for a few days after the others leave. In the final scene, we see Anna in a taxi to the airport on the phone to Alex, seemingly looking forward to seeing him again.

Cast
Kathryn Worth as Anna
Tom Hiddleston as Oakley
Mary Roscoe as Verena
David Rintoul as George
Emma Hiddleston as Badge
Henry Lloyd-Hughes as Jack
Harry Kershaw as Archie
Michael Hadley as Charlie

Several people who lived and worked on the estate where filming took place also appeared in the film and are credited as themselves.

Production
The film was shot on location in Italy. The cast lived in the house that the characters rent on the San Fabiano Estate, even sleeping in the bedrooms used in the film.

As the film was on a small budget, the production had to source costumes and props from what they already had. "We didn't have a huge budget where we could have an Edith Head approach and have everything especially designed for the film. It's finding what's there already. Doing that is always very interesting. One uncovers some nice stories and nice details." The dress that Anna wears, which is prominent throughout the film, originally belonged to Kathryn Worth's mother.

Reception
Unrelated premiered at the London Film Festival in 2007, where it won the FIPRESCI International Critics Prize. On its release in September 2008 it was hailed as one of the most original British films of the year. Critics remarked on its 'un-British' style and atmosphere, drawing comparisons to Ozu, Rohmer and Chabrol. Writing in The Sunday Times, Bryan Appleyard called it 'radical' for portraying a group of British middle class characters "simply as another tribe, one with its own customs, failings, virtues and, above all, human, all too human, anguish...In terms both of style and content, this is a radical and brilliant film that will, if there is any justice, come to be seen as a turning point for British cinema". In their December 2009 list of the 'Top 100 Films of The Decade', the film critics of The Guardian newspaper put Unrelated at number 21, the highest British film in the list. It currently holds an 87% rating score on Rotten Tomatoes.

Awards
FIPRESCI International Critics Prize at the London Film Festival 2007
The Guardian First Film Award 2008
The Evening Standard Most Promising Newcomer Award 2009 (Joanna Hogg)
Bursa International Silk Road Film Festival 2008 Best International Actress, Kathryn Worth
The Evening Standard Best Film 2009 (nominated)
London Film Critic's Circle Awards Breakthrough Film Maker Award (Joanna Hogg, nominated)

References

External links

2007 films
British drama films
Films directed by Joanna Hogg
2007 directorial debut films
2000s English-language films
2000s British films